Erythronium idahoense, commonly known as Idaho fawn lily, is a white-flowered plant in the Lily family native to the northwestern United States (Washington, Idaho, and Montana). Its habitats include grasslands and forest openings.

This taxon was listed as Erythronium grandiflorum subsp. candidum in Flora of North America.

References

hendersonii
Flora of the Northwestern United States
Plants described in 1929
Flora without expected TNC conservation status